This list of medieval stone bridges in Germany includes bridges that were built during the Middle Ages (between c. 500 and 1500 AD) on the territory of the present Federal Republic of Germany.

Table of medieval stone bridges

References

See also 
 List of Roman bridges
 List of medieval bridges in France

Medieval stone bridges in Germany
!List of medieval stone bridges
German stone bridges
!Medieval bridges in Germany
!Medieval bridges
Bridges, medieval